Frederick H. Mauer (April 19, 1862 – April 19, 1922) was an American baseball player. He played in one game for the 1886 New York Metropolitans, pitching two innings and also playing the outfield.

External links

1862 births
1922 deaths
19th-century baseball players
Major League Baseball outfielders
Major League Baseball pitchers
New York Metropolitans players
Baseball players from New Jersey
People from Hamburg, New Jersey
Sportspeople from Sussex County, New Jersey